Michael E. Ames (1822–1861) was a politician from Minnesota Territory, a member of the Democratic Party, and a former member of the Minnesota Territory House of Representatives, representing St. Paul, Minnesota. Furber served as Speaker of the Minnesota Territory House of Representatives in 1851.

Ames served as a delegate to Minnesota's Democratic Constitutional Convention in 1857.

References

1861 deaths
1822 births
Minnesota Democrats
Members of the Minnesota Territorial Legislature
19th-century American politicians